Komori is a Japanese surname. Notable people with the surname include:

Arthur Komori (1915–2000), Japanese-American spy
Junichi Komori (1941–2015), Japanese three-cushion billiards player
Kazutaka Komori (1943–1971), Japanese political activist
Kuriko Komori (born 1954), Japanese handball player
Miki Komori (born 1982), Japanese Porn Actress
Tomomi Komori (born 1983), Japanese field hockey player
Yōichi Komori (born 1953), Japanese literary critic 
Yoshie Komori (born 1937), Japanese fencer
, Japanese footballer
Yukino Komori (born 1996), Japanese idol
Yūta Komori, Japanese shogi player

Fictional characters
 Tomonori Komori (Akinori Komori), a character in Shadow Star (Narutaru)
 Aimi Komori, protagonists of Shadow Lady

Japanese-language surnames